Oladele Awobuluyi (born July 17, 1937) is a Nigerian linguist, professor, and author. He was born in Okeagbe, Akoko North-West in Ondo State, Nigeria. Awobuluyi's area of research focus is African languages, in particular Yoruba, as well as Kanuri and Edo. Awobuluyi founded the Department of Linguistics and Nigerian Languages at the University of Ilorin in 1976, and served as the department's first head from 1979 until September 1984. He is a fellow of the Nigerian Academy of Letters.

Education and teaching
Awobuluyi earned an B.A. in Classics at the University of Colorado Boulder in 1961, an M.A. in Latin from Columbia University in 1962, an M.A. in Linguistics from Columbia University in 1964, and his Ph.D. in Linguistics from Columbia University in 1967. Awobuluyi has taught at Michigan State University, CUNY, University of Lagos, University of Ilorin, and Adekunle Ajasin University.

Selected publications

Books

Essentials of Yoruba Grammar
Yoruba Metalanguage: a Glossary of English-Yoruba Technical Terms in Language, Literature and Methodology
Studies in the syntax of the standard Yoruba verb by Oladele Awobuluyi

The New National Policy on Education in Linguistic Perspective

Ìléwó ìkòwé Yorùbá òde-òní

Peace Corps Yoruba Course
 
Studies in the Syntax of the Standard Yoruba Verb
Yorùbá kò gbọdọ̀ kú
Linguistics and Nation Building: the Prof. Emeritus Ayọ Bamgbose Personality Lecture

Articles 

 "On the Reality of Vowel Coalescence in Yoruba", Studies in African Linguistics, December 1985, Vol.9(Dec), pp.11-14
"Issues in the Syntax of Standard Yoruba Focus Constructions", The Journal of West African Languages, Nov 1, 1992, Vol.22(2), p.69
"Towards a Typology of Coalescence", The Journal of West African Languages, November 1987, Vol.17(2), pp.5-22
"On 'The Subject Concord Prefix', in Yoruba", Studies in African Linguistics, Dec 1, 1975, Vol.6(3), p.215
"The Modifying Serial Construction: a Critique", Studies in African Linguistics, Mar 1, 1973, Vol.4(1), p.87
"On the Status of Prepositions", The Journal of West African Languages, Jul 1, 1971, Vol.8(2), p.101
"'High-Tone-Junction-Contracting Verbs' in Yoruba", The Journal of West African Languages, Jan 1, 1970, Vol.7(1), p.29
"The Particle If in Yoruba", The Journal of West African Languages, Jul 1, 1969, Vol.6(2), p.67

Tributes 

 Issues in Contemporary African Linguistics: a Festschrift for Ọladele Awobuluyi
 New Findings in the Study of Nigerian Languages and Literatures: a Festschrift in Honour of Oladele Awobuluyi
 Current Research in African Linguistics: Papers in Honor of Ọladele Awobuluyi

References 

1937 births
Linguists from Nigeria
Columbia Graduate School of Arts and Sciences alumni
Living people
University of Colorado Boulder alumni
People from Ondo State